Patrick Harvie (born 18 March 1973) is a Scottish politician who has served as Minister for Zero Carbon Buildings, Active Travel and Tenants' Rights since 2021. He has served as one of two co-leaders of the Scottish Greens since 2008, and is one of the first Green politicians in the UK to serve as a government minister. Harvie has been a Member of the Scottish Parliament (MSP) for the Glasgow region since 2003.

Born in Dunbartonshire, Harvie attended the Manchester Metropolitan University, where he was a member of the Labour Party. From a young age he was active in politics, having attended a Campaign for Nuclear Disarmament demo, while still in a pram. Harvie worked for a sexual health organisation, which led him into campaigning for equality. His experience of campaigning to repeal Section 28, led him to join the Scottish Green Party. Harvie was elected to the Scottish Parliament in the 2003 election, representing the Glasgow region.

In September 2008, Harvie was appointed as male co-convenor of the Scottish Greens, serving alongside Eleanor Scott, Martha Wardrop and Maggie Chapman. In 2019, following a constitutional change in the Green Party, he ran for co-leadership in the August election. He was elected alongside Lorna Slater. As Slater was not an MSP at the time, Alison Johnstone fulfilled her role within the Scottish Parliament, until May 2021. In August 2021, after entering a power-sharing agreement with the SNP, Harvie and Slater were both appointed to the Scottish Government as junior ministers, becoming the first Green Party politicians in the UK to serve in government.

Early life

Education and career 
Patrick Harvie was born on 18 March 1973 in Vale of Leven, Dunbartonshire. Harvie attended Dumbarton Academy from 1984 and 1991. He then studied at Manchester Metropolitan University, where he was briefly a member of the Labour party.

Before being elected to the Scottish Parliament, Harvie worked within the Gay Men's Project at the sexual health organisation PHACE West, later PHACE Scotland and now part of the Terrence Higgins Trust. He was initially a youth worker and later as Development Worker for the Lanarkshire Health Board area. Although this work was principally concerned with HIV prevention, it also involved Harvie in equality campaigning. Harvie also had a spell as a civil servant, working with the Inland Revenue in Dumbarton.

Early political years 
At a young age, Harvie became involved in politics, having first attended a Campaign for Nuclear Disarmament demo with his mother, while still in a pram. When he was ten, he told his mother that one day he would become Prime Minister. During his years at university he was a member of the Labour Party.

Harvie was active in the campaign to repeal Section 2A of the Local Government Act, more commonly known as Section 28. This campaign was successful, and he has stated that the experience prompted him to become more actively involved in politics, leading to his membership of the Scottish Green Party.

Early political career

First term; 2003 to 2007 

Harvie was elected as MSP for the Glasgow region at the 2003 Scottish Parliament election. He gained attention both for issues strongly associated with the Greens, such as campaigning against the extension to the M74 motorway in Glasgow, and for more 'mainstream' issues such as opposition to the Identity Cards Bill.

Quickly after becoming an MSP he caused some controversy by proposing civil partnership legislation in the Scottish Parliament. Though this legislation was ultimately handled at Westminster and covered the whole UK, the distinctive Scottish proposals helped to stimulate some public debate north of the border, both on the issue of same-sex relationships and on the process known as a Legislative Consent Motion by which the Scottish Parliament allows Westminster to legislate for the whole UK.

Harvie was a member of the Communities Committee of the Scottish Parliament throughout the 2nd Scottish Parliament and served as Scottish Greens Spokesperson for Justice and Communities from 2003 to 2005 and Spokesperson for Justice, Communities, Europe and Constitutional Affairs from 2005 to 2007. Through his work on the Communities Committee, he worked on the Anti-social behaviour Bill, the Charities Bill and the Housing Bill, as well as on issues of homelessness, debt, the planning system and building standards.

In 2004 Harvie was given the 'One to Watch' award at the annual Scottish Politician of the Year event. In addition to the Communities portfolio, Harvie covered the Justice portfolio for the Greens, and has been active on a number of civil liberties issues. He has also been convener of the Cross Party Group (CPG) on Human Rights, and helped to establish a CPG on Sexual Health.

Following the Green Party's disappointing performance in the 2007 election, Harvie was returned with a reduced share of the vote. The tight parliamentary arithmetic and a constructive relationship with the Scottish National Party led to a Co-operation Agreement between the two parties. Under this, Harvie was elected to be convene the Transport, Infrastructure and Climate Change Committee, an office he held until 2011.

He became the male co-convenor of the Scottish Greens on 22 September 2008 after being the only person to stand for the position. Re-elected in 2016, Harvie joined the Finance and Constitution Committee and became Scottish Greens Spokesperson for Finance, Economy, Fair Work and Equalities.

Co-leader of the Scottish Greens 
After changes to their constitution, Harvie was elected co-leader of Scottish Greens in a 2019 co-leadership election.

Bute House Agreement 

In August 2021 after weeks of talks, he was at Bute House with his co-leader Lorna Slater and First Minister Nicola Sturgeon to announce a power-sharing agreement that would see the Green party in government for the first time in the United Kingdom. There was no agreement on oil and gas exploration, but the government now argued that it had a stronger case for a national independence referendum. As part of the agreement the Green Party would have two ministers in government.

Junior minister; 2021 to present 
On 30 August 2021, Harvie was appointed Minister for Zero Carbon Buildings, Active Travel and Tenants' Rights. He and Slater are the first Green Party politicians in both Scottish and UK political history to serve in government.

During his tenure, COP26 was held in his home city of Glasgow and Harvie used to occasion to raise the issue of Scottish independence with world leaders. He also got into a dispute with Greenpeace, which had recently criticised Nicola Sturgeon. Sturgeon had asked the British Government whether the new Cambo oil field near Shetland should be "reassessed" in light of the climate crisis. However, Greenpeace said fence sitting was not good enough and urged the First Minister to "stop hiding behind Boris Johnson" and oppose the oilfield. Harvie said the organisation did not understand Scottish politics and the SNP's attachment to the oil industry. "I do think that we are more actively plugged into the Scottish political agenda than Greenpeace," Harvie told journalists. "And I do think Greenpeace, understandably, look at issues such as Cambo in a UK context and don't see it in a Scottish Parliament context.”

Political views

Scottish Independence 

As a member of the Scottish Greens, Harvie is a supporter of Scottish independence and voted 'Yes' in the 2014 Scottish independence referendum. In the run up to the referendum, he was part of the Yes Scotland campaign and campaigned alongside Nicola Sturgeon. While he campaigned in-favour, not as a 'nationalist', Harvie stated the cause for independence was "for a vision of Scotland as a peaceful country with social justice, equality and environmental protection at its core".

Since Scotland's strong rejection of Brexit in the 2016 EU membership Referendum, for which Harvie and the Greens campaigned 'Remain', he has voiced his support for the Scottish Government's proposal for a second independence referendum. In the 2021 Scottish election, the SNP and the Greens collectively won 72 of the 129 seats in the Scottish Parliament, with both parties pledging to hold a referendum before the end of 2023 if the COVID-19 pandemic subsides.

Scottish republicanism 

As well as a supporter of Scottish independence, Harvie supports an independent Scottish republic. He has been highly critical of the British monarchy, calling for the monarch to be replaced with a "democratically accountable head of state", as well as describing the Royal Family an "outdated, discredited and totally undemocratic institution".

Personal life
Harvie is bisexual, and in 2003 became the first openly bisexual Member of the Scottish Parliament. He is an advocate of Open Source and Free Software, and is a Linux user. His use of Twitter during an important political dinner drew much media comment.

Harvie was formerly an Honorary Associate of the National Secular Society, Honorary Vice-President of the Gay and Lesbian Humanist Association and a patron of Parents Enquiry Scotland. He was a board member of the former Glasgay! Festival, and is a member of Greenpeace, Friends of the Earth, Equality Network, Stonewall (UK), Amnesty International, Humanist Society Scotland, Campaign for Real Ale and the Campaign Against the Arms Trade. From 2003 until 2007, Harvie wrote a weekly column in the Scottish edition of the Big Issue.

Harvie was a candidate in the election for Rector of the University of Glasgow in February 2008.

Notes

References

External links
 
 
 Profile at Scottish Green Party

1973 births
Living people
People from West Dunbartonshire
Members of the Scottish Parliament 2003–2007
Bisexual men
Bisexual politicians
Scottish Green Party MSPs
Leaders of the Scottish Green Party
Members of the Scottish Parliament 2007–2011
Members of the Scottish Parliament 2011–2016
Members of the Scottish Parliament 2016–2021
Members of the Scottish Parliament 2021–2026
Scottish humanists
Scottish pacifists
People educated at Dumbarton Academy
British secularists
Labour Party (UK) people
LGBT members of the Scottish Parliament
Ministers of the Scottish Government
Scottish republicans
Scottish bisexual people